Area codes 819 and 873 are telephone area codes in the North American Numbering Plan (NANP) for central and western Quebec, Canada, including the Quebec portion of the National Capital Region, and the Hudson Strait and Ungava Bay coastlines of Quebec. Major cities in the territory include Gatineau, Sherbrooke, Trois-Rivières, Drummondville, Shawinigan, Victoriaville, Rouyn-Noranda, Val-d'Or, Magog and Mont-Laurier.

The incumbent local exchange carriers in 819/873 are Bell Canada, Bell Aliant, Telus, as well as Télébec and other independent companies. From 1992 to 1997, Northwestel was also an incumbent carrier in 819, as it included former Bell Canada areas in the Northwest Territories.

Area code 468 is reserved as a third area code in the region.

History

Ontario and Quebec were the only Canadian provinces that received assignments of multiple area codes by the American Telephone and Telegraph Company (AT&T) when the original North American area codes were created in 1947.

The eastern part of Quebec received area code 418, while the western part, from the US border to Hudson Strait, was assigned  area code 514. In a 1957 flash cut of the 514 numbering plan area, it was split into three segments. The southern region (including Montreal) retained 514; the middle region received 819, and the northern region, which had no telephone services, was added to 418.

Area code 819 thus bordered area code 613 and the new area code 705 in Ontario, area code 418 in the east and the north of Quebec, and the remainder of area code 514 in the south of Quebec.

When telephone service was introduced in the eastern Northwest Territories, most of which is now the territory of Nunavut, created in 1999, in Frobisher Bay in 1958, Bell Canada nominally made it part of area code 418. In the 1960s and the 1970s, telephone service was introduced by Bell Canada at other locations in the eastern Northwest Territories and in locations along the Quebec Arctic coastline, as well as by Sotel, an independent company, in the James Bay region. Those non-diallable locations also became part of area code 418.

In the late 1970s, the northern parts of area code 418 served by Sotel and Bell along James, Hudson and Ungava Bays and Hudson Strait, as well as the eastern Northwest Territories, were assigned to area code 819 as exchanges in that area began to receive direct distance dialling. Thus, area code 819 now also bordered area code 709 of Newfoundland in the Torngat Mountain area and area code 403 where Bell Canada and Northwestel service areas met, as well as area code 204 (Manitoba) and area code 807 (northwestern Ontario). Also, from the late 1970s to 1997, area code 819 extended one eighth of the way around the world, from the 45th parallel north at Stanstead, Quebec, to the North Pole by including much of the Northwest Territories along with most of western Quebec. Northwestel used Alberta's area code 403 for its services in Yukon and the Northwest Territories.

In 1997 and 1998, the portions of 819 in the Northwest Territories, as well as the portions of 403 in the Northwest Territories and Yukon, were transferred to area code 867, which was newly created to unite all of the Canadian territories, including Nunavut, which was created in 1999. Area code 819 was cut back to western Quebec, and area code 403 was reduced to serve only Alberta. Thus, borders with area codes 403, 204, and 807 were replaced with the single border on area code 867. Area code 514 was split shortly afterward, which changed area code's 819's border with 514 to a boundary with Area code 450, the new area code for the off-island suburbs of Montreal.

Until 2006, it was possible to make calls between Ottawa and Hull with only seven digits since Ottawa and Hull are a single local calling area. Central office code protection prevented the same seven-digit local number from being assigned in both Ottawa and Hull. Code protection was implemented in such a manner that if an exchange in +1-819-77x (1-819-PRovince) was in use in Hull, the corresponding +1-613-77x exchange could not be used anywhere in Eastern Ontario.  Conversely, if an exchange in +1-613-23x was used in Ottawa, the corresponding +1-819-23x exchange could not be used anywhere in western Quebec, even in areas a safe distance from the National Capital Region such as Mauricie and Estrie.

In Canada, even tiny hamlets are a rate centres, with multiple competitive local exchange carriers being issued 10,000-number blocks, each of which corresponds to a single three-digit prefix. Larger cities had multiple rate centres, most of which were not amalgamated during the creation of "megacities" in Quebec in 2002 and still remain separate. For instance, Hull was in 2002 merged into the "megacity" of Gatineau. However, the megacity has five separate rate centres, which have never been amalgamated. The city centre exchange (serving the former cities of Hull and Pointe-Gatineau) is still named "Ottawa-Hull," and the "Gatineau" exchange serves only the pre-merger city of Gatineau. The Gatineau and Aylmer exchanges, despite being part of the amalgamated municipality of Gatineau, remained long-distance calls to each other until a 16 August 2007 expansion of their local calling area, five years after the merger.

Many smaller rate centres do not need nearly that many numbers in order to adequately serve their customers, but a number cannot be assigned elsewhere once it has been allocated to a carrier and rate centre.  That resulted in thousands of wasted numbers, and the proliferation of cell phones and pagers have exacerbated the problem. By 2006, area code819 was effectively exhausted except for central office codes that theoretically could have been assigned in Hull but only by breaking seven-digit dialling between Ottawa and Hull. The situation could have been avoided if some +1-819 versions of the seven-digit Ottawa-Hull numbers had been assigned to areas a safe distance from the National Capital Region years earlier.
  
Ten-digit dialling became mandatory in both area codes, 819 and 613, on October 21, 2006, and exchange protection was largely ended. Seven-digit local calls in centres far from the area code boundary (such as Trois-Rivières or Belleville, with no local calling into any other area code at the time) were failing with intercept messages demanding customers to "dial the area code."

The only legacy of the old system is a "dual dialability" scheme for federal government numbers in the National Capital Region. All federal government offices on the Quebec side have duplicated their entire allocation of multiple exchanges worth of numbers available on the Ontario side.

Originally to be introduced in 2015, the CRTC on July 20, 2011 moved up the introduction of the new area code 873 to September 15, 2012 after a report stated that the current area code 819 would be exhausted by then. Area code 873 had never been assigned as a local exchange in 1-819 because the tiny border village Beebe Plain is divided between 1-819-876 Rock Island and 1-802-873 Derby Line, an international local call that had been given exchange code protection to permit seven-digit local dialling.

There is still no number pooling in Canada, and redundant telephone exchange rate centres are not merged when the underlying municipalities are amalgamated. The inefficient allocation of 10,000-number blocks to multiple carriers in each of multiple rate centres in what is often the same municipality continues unabated.

In February 2017, area code 468 was reserved as a third area code in the region. This area code became active on October 20, 2022.

Service area

Akulivik – (819) 496
Alleyn-et-Cawood – see Kazabazua
Amherst – see Mont-Tremblant
Amos – (819) 218, 442, 443, 444, 480, 724, 727, 732, 830, 834, 954 (873) 393, 730, 840, 999
Arundel – see Harrington
Ascot Corner – see Sherbrooke
Aston-Jonction – (819) 226, 256
Audet – see Lac-Mégantic
Aumond – see Maniwaki
Aupaluk – (819) 491
Austin – see Magog
Authier – see Macamic
Authier-Nord – see Macamic
Ayer's Cliff – (819) 838, 867
Barkmere – see Mont-Tremblant
Barnston-Ouest – see Ayer's Cliff
Barraute – (819) 733, 734
Béarn – (819) 726
Bécancour – (819) 233, 294, 297, 298, 406, 407, 589, 591, 602, 606, 608, 786, 936
Belcourt – see Senneterre
Belleterre – (819) 722
Berry – see Amos
Blue Sea – see Gracefield
Boileau – see Harrington
Bois-Franc – see Maniwaki
Bouchette – see Messines
Bowman – see Val-des-Bois
Brébeuf – see Mont-Tremblant
Bristol – see Shawville
Bryson – see Otter Lake
Bury – (819) 872
Campbell's Bay – see Otter Lake
Cantley – see Gatineau
Cayamant – see Gracefield
Champlain – (819) 295, 619
Champneuf – see Rochebaucourt
Charette – see Saint-Élie-de-Caxton
Chartierville – (819) 312, 656
Chazel – see La Sarre
Chelsea – (819) 335, 607, 827, 866 (873) 324
Chénéville – see Montpellier
Chesterville – (819) 202, 382, 504
Chichester – see L'Isle-aux-Allumettes
Chisasibi – (819) 855
Chute-Saint-Philippe – see Lac-des-Écorces
Clarendon – see Shawville
Clermont – see La Sarre
Clerval – see Dupuy
Cleveland – see Richmond
Coaticook – (819) 502, 804, 849, 926 (873)- 392 868
Compton – (819) 501, 835
Cookshire-Eaton – (819) 553, 875, 889 (873) 825
Danville – (819) 590, 642, 839
Daveluyville – (819) 367, 404, 447, 605
Déléage – see Maniwaki
Denholm – see Val-des-Monts
Deschaillons-sur-Saint-Laurent – (819) 292, 599, 632, (873) 267 391
Dixville – see Coaticook
Doncaster - see Sainte-Agathe-des-Monts
Drummondville – (819) 250, 313, 314, 388, 390, 445, 461, 469, 470, 471, 472, 473, 474, 475, 477, 478, 479, 803, 816, 817, 818, 850, 857, 870, 883, 967, 991, (873) 270, 377, 382
Dudswell – (819) 884, 887
Duhamel – see Montpellier
Duhamel-Ouest – see Ville-Marie
Duparquet – (819) 948
Dupuy – (819) 783
Durham-Sud – (873) 200, 248, 339, 858, 970
East Angus – (819) 251, 451, 832 (873) 827
East Hereford – (819) 514, 844
Eastmain – (819) 865 977 (873) 358 544
Eeyou Istchee Baie-James – (819) 638, 672, 756, 853, 854, 941
Egan-Sud – see Maniwaki
Fassett – see Montebello
Ferme-Neuve – (819) 206, 587
Fort-Coulonge – see Mansfield-et-Pontefract
Fortierville – (819) 287, 792
Frontenac – (873) 585, 624
Fugèreville – (819) 748
Gallichan – see Palmarolle
Gatineau – (819) 205, 208, 209, 210, 213, 230, 243, 246, 259, 271, 281, 282, 303, 307, 317, 318, 319, 328, 329, 332, 351, 360, 376, 410, 412, 414, 420, 431, 439, 469, 483, 484, 485, 486, 500, 503, 506, 510, 525, 557, 561, 568, 576, 592, 593, 595, 598, 600, 617, 643, 624, 635, 639, 654, 661, 663, 664, 665, 669, 682, 684, 685, 700, 708, 712, 718, 743, 744, 770, 771, 772, 773, 775, 776, 777, 778, 779, 790, 800, 815, 881, 886, 893, 904, 914, 915, 916, 918, 920, 921, 923, 928, 930, 931, 934, 938, 939, 953, 955, 956, 957, 961, 962, 965, 966, 968, 986, 994, 997, 999, (873) 320, 322, 386, 396, 397, 408, 469, 510, 738, 800
Gracefield – (819) 463 (873) 326
Grand-Remous – (819) 438 (873) 327
Grand-Saint-Esprit – see Sainte-Monique
Grandes-Piles – see Shawinigan
Grenville – see Grenville-sur-la-Rouge
Grenville-sur-la-Rouge – (819) 242
Guérin – see Nédélec
Ham-Nord – (819) 344, 464
Ham-Sud – see Weedon
Hampden – see Sherbrooke
Harrington – (819) 687, (873) 275 
Harrington – (819) 687, (873) 275 
Hatley – see Ayer's Cliff
Hunter's Point – see Témiscaming
Inukjuak – (819) 254
Ivry-sur-le-Lac – see Sainte-Agathe-des-Monts
Ivujivik – (819) 922
Kangiqsualujjuaq – (819) 337
Kangiqsujuaq – (819) 338
Kangirsuk – (819) 935
Kazabazua – (819) 467 (873) 328
Kebaowek – see Témiscaming
Kiamika - see Lac-des-Écorces
Kingsbury - see Richmond
Kingsey Falls – (819) 363, 645
Kipawa – see Témiscaming
Kitcisakik – see Val-d'Or
Kitigan Zibi – see Maniwaki
Kuujjuaq – (819) 900, 964
Kuujjuarapik – (819) 929
L'Ange-Gardien – see Gatineau
L'Ascension – see Rivière-Rouge
L'Avenir – (819) 394, 494
L'Île-du-Grand-Calumet – see Otter Lake
L'Isle-aux-Allumettes – (819) 689 (873) 323
La Bostonnais – see La Tuque
La Conception – see Mont-Tremblant
La Corne – (819) 799, (873) 372
La Macaza – see Rivière-Rouge
La Minerve – (819) 274, (873) 274
La Morandière-Rochebaucourt – (819) 754
La Motte – see Amos
La Patrie – see Notre-Dame-des-Bois
La Pêche – (819) 456, 459, 720 (873) 338
La Reine – (819) 947
La Tuque – (819) 521, 523, 662, 666, 667, 676, 680, (873) 403, 407
La Sarre – (819) 301, 333, 339, 482, 520, 940, (873) 380
Labelle – (819) 236, 686, (873) 284
Lac-des-Écorces – (819) 387, 585
Lac-des-Plages – see Namur
Lac-Drolet – (819) 232, 549
Lac-du-Cerf – see Saint-Aimé-du-Lac-des-Îles
Lac-Édouard – (819) 653
Lac-Mégantic – (819) 214, 237, 417, 554, 582, 583, 614, 890, 907, 910, (873) 652, 732, 889
Lac-Pythonga – (819) 435
Lac-Saguay – see Nominingue
Lac-Saint-Paul – see Ferme-Neuve
Lac-Sainte-Marie – see Kazabazua
Lac-Simon – see Val-d'Or
Lac-Simon – see Montpellier
Lac-Supérieur – see Mont-Tremblant
Lac-Tremblant-Nord – see Mont-Tremblant
Laforce – see Belleterre
Landrienne – see Amos
Lantier – see Sainte-Agathe-des-Monts
Latulipe-et-Gaboury – (819) 747, 750
Launay – see Taschereau
Laurierville – (819) 365, (873) 829
Laverlochère-Angliers – (819) 765, 949
Lebel-sur-Quévillon – (819) 706, 755, 925
Leclercville – see Deschaillons-sur-Saint-Laurent
Lefebvre – see L'Avenir
Lemieux – see Sainte-Marie-de-Blandford
Lingwick – see Sherbrooke
Litchfield – see Otter Lake
Lochaber – see Thurso
Lochaber-Partie-Ouest – see Gatineau
Lorrainville – (819) 625
Louiseville – (819) 228, 498, 721 (873)- 398 865 866 
Low – (819) 422 (873) 329
Lyster – (819) 389, (873) 828
Macamic – (819) 782
Maddington Falls – see Daveluyville
Magog – (819) 201, 594, 703, 746, 769, 843, 847, 868, 869, 927, (873) 404
Malartic – (819) 757, 924
Manawan – (819) 971 (873) 733
Maniwaki – (819) 215, 305, 306, 315, 334, 441, 449, 462, 528, 892, 982 (873)- 331 390 650 734
Manseau – (819) 356, 567
Mansfield-et-Pontefract – (819) 683 (873) 325, 864
Marston – see Lac-Mégantic
Martinville – see Compton
Maskinongé – (819) 227, 497, 626, (873) 268
Matagami – (819) 739
Mayo – see Gatineau
Melbourne – see Richmond
Messines – (819) 465 (873) 321
Milan – see Scotstown
Moffet – see Latulipe-et-Gaboury
Mont-Blanc – (819) 688, 713, (873) 280
Mont-Laurier – (819) 203, 401, 436, 440, 499, 513, 616, 623, 660, 833, 951, (873) 388 867
Mont-Saint-Michel – see Ferme-Neuve
Mont-Tremblant – (819) 341, 421, 425, 429, 430, 631, 681, 717, 808, 897, (873) 279
Montcalm – see Mont-Tremblant
Montcerf-Lytton – see Maniwaki
Montebello – (819) 309, 393, 423 (873) 332
Montpellier – (819) 428, 508
Mulgrave-et-Derry – see Gatineau
Namur – (819) 426
Nantes – (819) 547
Nédélec – (819) 784
Nemaska – (819) 673
Newport – see Sherbrooke
Nicolet – (819) 262, 293
Nominingue – (819) 278, 304, (873) 282
Normétal – (819) 788
North Hatley – (819) 409, 675, 794, 842
Notre-Dame-de-Bonsecours – see Montebello
Notre-Dame-de-Ham – see Ham-Nord
Notre-Dame-de-la-Merci – see Saint-Donat
Notre-Dame-de-la-Paix – (819) 522
Notre-Dame-de-la-Salette – (819) 766
Notre-Dame-de-Lourdes – (819) 245, 385
Notre-Dame-des-Bois – (819) 235, 888
Notre-Dame-du-Bon-Conseil – see Sainte-Clotilde-de-Horton
Notre-Dame-du-Laus – (819) 767, 793
Notre-Dame-du-Mont-Carmel – see Trois-Rivières
Notre-Dame-du-Nord – (819) 723
Notre-Dame-de-Pontmain – see Saint-Aimé-du-Lac-des-Îles
Obedjiwan – (819) 974
Ogden – see Stanstead
Orford – see Magog
Otter Lake – (819) 453, 648, 650 (873) 863
Palmarolle – (819) 787
Papineauville – (819) 308, 427, 476 (873) 333
Parisville – see Deschaillons-sur-Saint-Laurent
Pikogan – see Amos
Piopolis – see Lac-Mégantic
Plaisance – see Papineauville
Plessisville – (819) 252, 291, 362, 621, 789, 998, (873) 735
Pontiac – (819) 391, 455, 458, 894 (873) 330, 335
Portage-du-Fort – see Shawville
Poularies – see Macamic
Preissac – see Amos
Princeville – (819) 234, 361, 364, 413, 505
Puvirnituq – (819) 988
Quaqtaq – (819) 492
Rapid Lake – see Maniwaki
Rapide-Danseur – see Duparquet
Rémigny – (819) 761
Richmond – (819) 518, 644, 826, 905, 908, 912
Ripon – see Saint-André-Avellin
Rivière-Héva – (819) 735
Rivière-Rouge – (819) 275, (873) 283
Roquemaure – see Palmarolle
Rouyn-Noranda – (819) 277, 279, 290, 490, 493, 649, 637, 759, 760, 762, 763, 764, 768, 797, 880, 917, 945 (873)- 379 842 861
Saint-Adolphe-d'Howard – (819) 327, 714, (873) 278
Saint-Adrien – see Wotton
Saint-Aimé-du-Lac-des-Îles – (819) 403, 597
Saint-Albert – (819) 353, 630
Saint-Alexis-des-Monts – (819) 265
Saint-André-Avellin – (819) 405, 516, 885, 981, 983 (873) 651
Saint-Augustin-de-Woburn – (819) 544, (873) 622
Saint-Barnabé – (819) 264, 402
Saint-Benoît-du-Lac – see Magog
Saint-Bonaventure – see Saint-Guillaume
Saint-Boniface – (819) 535, 655
Saint-Bruno-de-Guigues – (819) 728
Saint-Camille – see Wotton
Saint-Celestin – (819) 229, 963 (873)-384
Saint-Christophe-d'Arthabaska – see Victoriaville
Saint-Claude – see Windsor
Saint-Cyrille-de-Wendover – (819) 397, 781, 836
Saint-Denis-de-Brompton – see Sherbrooke
Saint-Dominique-du-Rosaire – see Amos
Saint-Donat – (819) 419, 424, (873) 277
Saint-Edmond-de-Grantham – see Saint-Germain-de-Grantham
Saint-Édouard-de-Fabre – (819) 634, 670
Saint-Édouard-de-Maskinongé – see Saint-Paulin
Saint-Élie-de-Caxton – (819) 221, (873) 409
Saint-Émile-de-Suffolk – see Namur
Saint-Étienne-des-Grès – see Trois-Rivières
Saint-Eugène – Saint-Guillaume
Saint-Eugène-de-Guigues – (819) 785
Saint-Félix-de-Dalquier – see Amos
Saint-Félix-de-Kingsey – (819) 512, 848
Saint-Fortunat – see Ham-Nord
Saint-François-Xavier-de-Brompton – see Windsor
Saint-Georges-de-Windsor – see Wotton
Saint-Germain-de-Grantham – (819) 395, 495, 730
Saint-Guillaume – (819) 396, 596
Saint-Herménégilde – see Coaticook
Saint-Isidore-de-Clifton – (819) 515, 658
Saint-Justin – see Maskinongé
Saint-Lambert – see Normétal
Saint-Léon-le-Grand – see Louiseville
Saint-Léonard-d'Aston – (819) 399, 615, 937
Saint-Louis-de-Blandford – see Princeville
Saint-Luc-de-Vincennes – see Trois-Rivières
Saint-Lucien – see Drummondville
Saint-Ludger – (819) 548, (873) 409
Saint-Majorique-de-Grantham – see Drummondville
Saint-Malo – see Saint-Isidore-de-Clifton
Saint-Marc-de-Figuery – see Amos
Saint-Mathieu-d'Harricana – see Amos
Saint-Mathieu-du-Parc – (819) 532
Saint-Maurice – see Trois-Rivières
Saint-Nazaire-d'Acton – (819) 392, 558
Saint-Norbert-d'Arthabaska – (819) 261, 369, 882
Saint-Paulin – (819) 268, (873) 399
Saint-Pierre-les-Becquets – (819) 263, 745
Saint-Prosper-de-Champlain – see Trois-Rivières
Saint-Rémi-de-Tingwick – see Tingwick
Saint-Roch-de-Mékinac – see Trois-Rives
Saint-Rosaire – see Victoriaville
Saint-Samuel – see Saint-Albert
Saint-Sébastien – (819) 652
Saint-Sévère – see Saint-Barnabé
Saint-Sixte – see Saint-André-Avellin
Saint-Stanislas – see Trois-Rivières
Saint-Sylvère – (819) 285, 546
Saint-Valère – see Saint-Albert
Saint-Venant-de-Paquette – see Saint-Isidore-de-Clifton
Saint-Wenceslas – (819) 224, 526
Sainte-Agathe-des-Monts – (819) 216, 217, 219, 321, 323, 324, 325, 326, 507, 774, 896, 281, 222, 603, 863
Sainte-Angèle-de-Prémont – see Saint-Paulin
Sainte-Anne-du-Lac – (819) 586, 814
Sainte-Brigitte-des-Saults – see Sainte-Clotilde-de-Horton
Sainte-Catherine-de-Hatley – see Magog
Sainte-Cécile-de-Lévrard – see Saint-Pierre-les-Becquets
Sainte-Cécile-de-Whitton – see Lac-Mégantic
Sainte-Christine - see Durham-Sud
Sainte-Clotilde-de-Horton - (819) 204, 336, (873) 452 
Sainte-Edwidge-de-Clifton - see Coaticook
Sainte-Élizabeth-de-Warwick - see Warwick
Sainte-Eulalie – (819) 225, 798
Sainte-Françoise – see Fortierville
Sainte-Germaine-Boulé – see Palmarolle
Sainte-Gertrude-Manneville – see Amos
Sainte-Hélène-de-Chester – see Chesterville
Sainte-Hélène-de-Mancebourg – see La Sarre
Sainte-Lucie-des-Laurentides – see Sainte-Agathe-des-Monts
Sainte-Marie-de-Blandford – (819) 283, 545
Sainte-Monique – (819) 289, 530
Sainte-Perpétue – see Sainte-Clotilde-de-Horton
Sainte-Séraphine – see Sainte-Clotilde-de-Horton
Sainte-Sophie-d'Halifax – see Plessisville
Sainte-Sophie-de-Lévrard – (819) 288, 899
Sainte-Thérèse-de-la-Gatineau – see Maniwaki
Sainte-Ursule – see Louiseville
Saints-Martyrs-Canadiens – see Ham-Nord
Salluit – (819) 255
Scotstown – (819) 231, 657
Senneterre – (819) 737, 952 (873)- 373, 402
Shawinigan – (819) 247, 529, 531, 533, 534, 536, 537, 538, 539, 540, 556, 719, 729, 731, 805, 852, 913, 989, (873) 271, 378, 405, 737
Shawville – (819) 509, 647 (873)- 746 862
Sheenboro – see L'Isle-aux-Allumettes
Sherbrooke – (819) 200, 212, 238, 239, 240, 276, 300, 340, 342, 345, 346, 347, 348, 349, 366, 416, 432, 434, 437, 446, 452, 481, 541, 542, 560, 562, 563, 564, 565, 566, 569, 570, 571, 572, 573, 574, 575, 577, 578, 580, 588, 612, 620, 636, 640, 674, 678, 679, 742, 780, 791, 812, 820, 821, 822, 823, 829, 846, 861, 864, 891, 919, 933, 943, 969, 987, 993, (873) 371, 389, 500, 600, 601, 602, 603, 604, 605, 606, 607, 608, 609, 826, 888
Stanstead – (819) 267, 704, 876
Stanstead-Est – see Stanstead
Stoke – (819) 258, 543, 878
Stornoway – see Saint-Sébastien
Taschereau – (819) 796
Tasiujaq – (819) 633
Témiscaming – (819) 220, 627
Thorne – see Shawville
Thurso – (819) 659, 707, 985 (873) 337
Timiskaming – see Notre-Dame-du-Nord
Tingwick – (819) 359, 749
Trécesson – see Amos
Trois-Rives – (819) 241, 646
Trois-Rivières – (819) 244, 266, 269, 299, 370, 371, 372, 373, 374, 375, 376, 377, 378, 379, 380, 383, 384, 386, 415, 448, 489, 519, 524, 601, 609, 668, 690, 691, 692, 693, 694, 695, 696, 697, 698, 699, 701, 801, 807, 840, 841, 862, 898, 909, 944, 979, 992, 995, 996, (873) 220, 255, 269, 387, 410, 804, 887
Ulverton – see Richmond
Umiujaq – (819) 331
Val-d'Or – (819) 270, 280, 316, 354, 355, 488, 527, 550, 651, 710, 736, 738, 824, 825, 831, 856, 859, 860, 874, 975 (873)- 381 395 770 841 860
Val-David – (819) 320, 322 (873) 276
Val-des-Bois – (819) 454
Val-des-Lacs – see Sainte-Agathe-des-Monts
Val-des-Monts – (819) 457, 671, 813, 903 (873) 336
Val-des-Sources – (819) 223, 716, 879
Val-Joli – see Windsor
Val-Morin – see Sainte-Agathe-des-Monts
Val-Racine – see Scotstown
Val-Saint-Gilles – see La Sarre
Victoriaville – (819) 260, 302, 330, 350, 352, 357, 402, 433, 460, 551, 552, 604, 740, 751, 752, 758, 795, 806, 809, 960, 980, 984, 990, (873) 300 303, 375, 406 430
Ville-Marie – (819) 622, 629, 702, 946 (873)- 374, 394, 736
Villeroy – (819) 381, 715
Waltham – see L'Isle-aux-Allumettes
Warwick – (819) 358, 559, 641
Waskaganish – (819) 895
Waswanipi – (819) 753
Waterville – (819) 408, 677, 837, (873) 623
Weedon – (819) 877, (873) 266 823
Wemindji – (819) 978
Wemotaci – see La Tuque
Westbury – see Sherbrooke
Wickham – (819) 398, 400, 741
Windsor – (819) 517, 628, 725, 845, 932
Winneway – see Belleterre
Wôlinak – see Bécancour
Wotton – (819) 286, 828
Yamachiche – (819) 296, 466, 618
shared-cost service – (819) 310
Premium services – 1+(819/873) 976.

See also
List of North American Numbering Plan area codes

References

External links
CNA exchange list for area +1-819
CNA exchange list for area +1-873
Telecom archives
Local Calling Guide
Area Code Map of Canada

819
Communications in Quebec